Tang-e Rahin (also Romanized as Tang-e Rāhīn) is a village in Bazman Rural District, Bazman District, Iranshahr County, Sistan and Baluchestan Province, Iran. According to the 2006 census, its population was 81 with 12 families.

References 

Populated places in Iranshahr County